The Four Seasons Hotel St. Louis is a hotel located in downtown St. Louis, Missouri. It is well known for its luxury suites and extensive modern art collection said to be worth over $7 million. Due to its central location in the city, it is a popular destination for those attending events at Busch Stadium and the Enterprise Center.

References

 

Hotels in St. Louis
Downtown St. Louis
Buildings and structures in St. Louis